Hanabiko "Koko" (July 4, 1971 – June 19, 2018) was a female western lowland gorilla. Koko was born in San Francisco Zoo, and lived most of her life at The Gorilla Foundation's preserve in the Santa Cruz Mountains. Koko gained public attention upon a report of her having adopted a kitten as a pet and naming him "All Ball", which the public perceived as her ability to rhyme.

Her instructor and caregiver, Francine Patterson, reported that Koko had an active vocabulary of more than 1,000 signs of what Patterson calls "Gorilla Sign Language" (GSL). This puts Koko's vocabulary at the same level as a three-year-old human. In contrast to other experiments attempting to teach sign language to non-human primates, Patterson simultaneously exposed Koko to spoken English from an early age. It was reported that Koko understood approximately 2,000 words of spoken English, in addition to the signs. Koko's life and learning process has been described by Patterson and various collaborators in books, peer-reviewed scientific articles, and on a website.

As with other great-ape language experiments, the extent to which Koko mastered and demonstrated language through the use of these signs is debated. The linguist Geoffrey K. Pullum has called Koko's claimed abilities "mythical", writing that she never did more than "flailing around producing signs at random", and criticized much press coverage of Patterson's claims as "sentimental nonsense". Koko is said to have understood nouns, verbs, and adjectives, including abstract concepts like "good" and "fake", and was able to ask simple questions. It is generally accepted that she did not use syntax or grammar, and that her use of language did not exceed that of a young human child. However, she scored between 70 and 90 on various infant IQ scales, and some experts, including Mary Lee Jensvold, claim that Koko "[used] language the same way people do".

Early life and popularity
Koko was born on July 4, 1971, at the San Francisco Zoo to her biological mother Jacqueline and father Bwana. Koko was the 50th gorilla born in captivity and one of the first gorillas accepted by her mother in captivity. Koko remained with her mother until the age of one when Koko was taken to the zoo's hospital to be treated for a life-threatening illness. Patterson along with Charles Pasternak originally cared for Koko at the San Francisco Zoo as part of their doctoral research at Stanford University after Koko came to the zoo's hospital. Koko was loaned to Patterson and Pasternak under the condition that they would spend at least four years with her. Eventually, Koko remained with Patterson, supported by The Gorilla Foundation, which Patterson founded to support gorilla research and conservation.

In 1978, Koko gained worldwide attention as she was pictured on the cover of National Geographic magazine. The cover picture was an image of Koko taking her own picture in the mirror. Koko was later featured on the cover of National Geographic in 1985 with a picture of her and her kitten, All Ball. At the preserve, Koko also met and interacted with a variety of celebrities including Robin Williams, Fred Rogers, Betty White, William Shatner, Flea, Leonardo DiCaprio, Peter Gabriel, and Sting.

Characteristics

Use of language

Patterson reported that Koko's use of signs indicated that she mastered the use of sign language. Koko's training began at the age of 1 and she had a working vocabulary of more than 1,000 signs, which she was able to combine in complex ways. Despite her dexterity and literacy, she was never taught how to write.

Patterson reported that Koko made several complex uses of signs that suggested a more developed degree of cognition than is usually attributed to non-human primates and their use of communication; for example, Koko was reported to use displacement (the ability to communicate about objects that are not currently present). At age 19, Koko was able to pass the mirror test of self-recognition, which most other gorillas fail. She had been reported to relay personal memories. Koko was reported to use meta-language, being able to use language reflexively to speak about language itself, signing "good sign" to another gorilla who successfully used signing. Koko was reported to use language deceptively, and to use counterfactual statements for humorous effects, suggesting an underlying theory of other minds.

Patterson reported that she documented Koko inventing new signs to communicate novel thoughts; for example, she said that nobody taught Koko the word for "ring", but to refer to it, Koko combined the words "finger" and "bracelet", hence "finger-bracelet".

Criticism
Criticism from some scientists centered on the fact that while publications often appeared in the popular press about Koko, scientific publications with substantial data were fewer in number. Other researchers argued that Koko did not understand the meaning behind what she was doing and learned to complete the signs simply because the researchers rewarded her for doing so (indicating that her actions were the product of operant conditioning). Another concern that has been raised about Koko's ability to express coherent thoughts through signs is that interpretation of the gorilla's conversation was left to the handler, who may have seen improbable concatenations of signs as meaningful; for example, when Koko signed "sad" there was no way to tell whether she meant it with the connotation of "How sad". Following Patterson's initial publications in 1978, a series of critical evaluations of her reports of signing behavior in great apes argued that video evidence suggested that Koko was simply being prompted by her trainers' unconscious cues to display specific signs, in what is commonly called the Clever Hans effect.

Intelligence
Between 1972 and 1977, Koko was administered several infant IQ tests, including the Cattell Infant Intelligence Scale and form B of the Peabody Picture Vocabulary Test. She achieved scores in the 70–90 range, which is comparable to a human infant that is slow but not intellectually impaired. According to Francine Patterson, however, it is specious to compare her IQ directly with that of a human infant because gorillas develop locomotor abilities earlier than humans and many IQ tests for infants require mostly motor responses. Gorillas and humans also mature at different rates, so using a gorilla's chronological age to compute their IQ results in a score that is not very useful for comparative purposes.

Pets
Researchers at The Gorilla Foundation said that Koko asked for a cat for Christmas in 1983. Ron Cohn, a biologist with the foundation, explained to the Los Angeles Times that when she was given a lifelike stuffed animal, she was less than satisfied. She did not play with it and continued to sign "sad". So on her birthday in July 1984, she was able to choose a kitten from a litter of abandoned kittens. Koko selected a gray male Manx and named him "All Ball". Penny Patterson, who had custody of Koko and who had organized The Gorilla Foundation, wrote that Koko cared for the kitten as if he were a baby gorilla. Researchers said that she tried to nurse All Ball and was very gentle and loving. They believed that Koko's nurturing of the kitten and the skills she gained through playing with dolls would be helpful in Koko's learning how to nurture an offspring.

In December 1984, All Ball escaped from Koko's cage and was killed by a car. Later, Patterson said that when she signed to Koko that All Ball had been killed, Koko signed "Bad, sad, bad" and "Frown, cry, frown, sad, trouble". Patterson also reported later hearing Koko making a sound similar to human weeping.

In 1985, Koko was allowed to pick out two new kittens from a litter to be her companions. The animals she chose, which she named "Lips" and "Smoky", were also Manxes. Koko picked the name after seeing the tiny orange Manx for the first time. When her trainer asked the meaning of the name, Koko answered, Lips lipstick.

The Gorilla Foundation also briefly played home to a male green-winged macaw of mysterious origin who had been found inhabiting the grounds and feeding on the loquat trees, though he was not a pet of Koko's in the same way her cats were. Initially frightened of the parrot, Koko named him "Devil Tooth", "devil" presumably coming from his being mostly red, and "tooth" for his fierce-looking white beak; the human staff adjusted the name to "Devil Beak", and ultimately to "DB".

To celebrate her birthday in July 2015, Koko was presented another litter of kittens. Picking two, she named them Miss Black and Miss Grey.

Nipple fixation
Koko was reported to have a preoccupation with both male and female human nipples, with several people saying that Koko requested to see their nipples. In 2005, three female staff members at The Gorilla Foundation, where Koko resided, filed lawsuits against the organization, alleging that they were pressured to reveal their nipples to Koko by the organization's executive director, Francine Patterson (Penny), among other violations of labor law.  The lawsuit alleged that in response to signing from Koko, Patterson pressured Keller and Alperin (two of the female staff) to flash the ape. "Oh, yes, Koko, Nancy has nipples. Nancy can show you her nipples," Patterson reportedly said on one occasion. And on another: "Koko, you see my nipples all the time. You are probably bored with my nipples. You need to see new nipples. I will turn my back so Kendra can show you her nipples." Shortly thereafter, a third woman filed suit, alleging that upon being first introduced to Koko, Patterson told her that Koko was communicating that she wanted to see the woman's nipples, pressuring her to submit to Koko's demands and informing her that "everyone does it for her around here." When the woman briefly lifted her t-shirt, flashing her undergarments, Patterson admonished the woman and reiterated that Koko wanted to see her nipples. When the woman relented and showed her breasts to Koko, Patterson commented "Oh look, Koko, she has big nipples." On another occasion, one of the gorilla's handlers told the woman that Koko wanted to be alone with her. When the woman went to Koko's enclosure, Koko began signing "Let down your hair. Lie down on the floor. Show your breasts again. Close your eyes," before beginning to squat and breathe heavily. The lawsuits were settled out of court. Gorilla expert Kristen Lukas has said that other gorillas are not known to have had a similar nipple fixation.

Later life and death
After Patterson's research with Koko was completed, the gorilla moved to a reserve in Woodside, California. At the reserve, Koko lived with another gorilla, Michael, who also learned sign language, but he died in 2000. She then lived with another male gorilla, Ndume, until her death.

Koko died in her sleep during the morning of June 19, 2018, at the Gorilla Foundation's preserve in Woodside, California, at the age of 46. The Gorilla Foundation released a statement that "The impact has been profound and what she has taught us about the emotional capacity of gorillas and their cognitive abilities will continue to shape the world." Even though Koko was 46 years old when she died, her death took staff members of the Gorilla Foundation by surprise.

In popular culture

Books and documentaries
 1978 Koko: A Talking Gorilla, a documentary film by Barbet Schroeder
 1978 cover of National Geographic magazine that Koko photographed, as well as feature article
 1980 Congo, a novel by Michael Crichton inspired by Koko's story
 1981 The Education of Koko, a book by Patterson and naturalist Eugene Linden
 1985 Koko's Kitten, a picture book by Patterson and photographer Ronald Cohn
 1986 Silent Partners: The Legacy of the Ape Language Experiments, a book by Eugene Linden
 1987 Koko's Story, a children's book by Patterson for Scholastic Corporation
 1990 Koko's Kitten, a 15-minute re-enactment of the story of the gorilla's adoption of a kitten, featured in the PBS children's show Reading Rainbow 
 1999 A Conversation with Koko, a PBS documentary for Nature, narrated by Martin Sheen
 1999 The Parrot's Lament, by Eugene Linden
 2000 Koko-Love!, a picture book by Patterson and photographer Ronald Cohn
 2001 Koko and Robin Williams, a short featurette on Robin Williams meeting Koko
 2008 Little Beauty, a picture book by Anthony Browne inspired by Koko's adoption of a pet kitten
 2016 Koko: The Gorilla Who Talks to People, a BBC documentary also shown on PBS
 2019 A Wish for Koko, a children's book in honor of Koko's life
 2019 Koko the Gorilla, The Musers commentary on Kokos life

Movies and TV shows
 1998 Seinfeld, Season 9, Episode 19 (The Maid); George is nicknamed "Koko the monkey" after co-workers witness him yelling and flailing his arms with a banana in his hand 
 1998 Mr Rogers' Neighborhood, Episode 1727 (You and I Together); Mister Rogers visits with Koko who has learned how to communicate in sign language
 2009 The Big Bang Theory, Season 3, Episode 10 (The Gorilla Experiment); Sheldon makes an attempt to teach physics to Penny, like when Koko learned Sign Language.

See also
 Primate cognition
 List of individual apes

References

Further reading

 Patterson, Dr. Francine (1987). Koko's Kitten. Scholastic, Inc. 
 Patterson, Francine and Wendy Gordon (1993). "The case for the personhood of gorillas" In: P Cavalieri and P Singer (Eds) The Great Ape Project: Equality Beyond Humanity, St. Martin's Press, pp. 58–77. .

Weiner, Jody (2005). "Hot Koko". California Lawyer. p. 80.
Weiner, Jody (2006). "Hot Koko & the Fetching Cat". Kinship with Animals. Updated Edition Ed. Kate Solisti and Michael Tobias. San Francisco/Tulsa: Council Oak. pp. 182–88.

External links

Apes from language studies
1971 animal births
2018 animal deaths
Individual gorillas
Individual primates in the United States
History of the San Francisco Bay Area
Culture in the San Francisco Bay Area
Female mammals